David Maxwell Stanley (September 9, 1928 – August 26, 2015) was an American politician in the state of Iowa.

Career 
Stanley was born in Dubuque, Iowa in 1928, the son of C. Maxwell and Elizabeth Stanley. He attended the University of Iowa Law School and engaged in the practice of law.

Stanley worked as the Iowa field director for the United World Federalists.

Stanley served in the Iowa State Legislature from 1959 to 1969, when he resigned to run against Fred Schwengel. Stanely also served in the legislature from 1973 to 1975 as a Republican, first serving three terms in the state House, two in the Senate, and once again in the House. In 1974, Stanley ran to fill Harold E. Hughes senate seat but narrowly lost to John Culver.

Stanley also helped create Iowans for Tax Relief and served as its chairman for a time.

Personal life 
Stanley married Jean Leu in June 1948.

Death 
He died on August 26, 2015.

References

1928 births
2015 deaths
Politicians from Dubuque, Iowa
University of Iowa College of Law alumni
Iowa lawyers
Republican Party members of the Iowa House of Representatives
20th-century American lawyers